The Peugeot Type 6 was the ordinally last Peugeot vehicle to carry over the tired 2-hp 565 cc V-twin from the earliest Peugeot models.  It was larger than the Type 5 and offered for 1894 only.  A mere 7 units were built and sold, of which one survives in Louwman's museum in the Netherlands.

References

Peugeot Car Models 1889-1909
Peugeot Type 6/7 at Histomobile
Peugeot 6 at Louwman's car museum, The Netherlands

1890s cars
Type 6
Rear-engined vehicles
Vehicles introduced in 1894